Rodrigo Vargas  may refer to:
Rodrigo Vargas (fighter) ( born 1985), Mexican professional mixed martial artist 
Rodrigo Vargas (soccer, born 1978), Australian soccer centre-back
Rodrigo Vargas (footballer, born 1989), Bolivian football midfielder
Rodrigo Vargas (footballer, born 1994), Bolivian football forward

See also
 Miguel Rodrigo Vargas (born 1978), Portuguese footballer